Bulborhodopis barbicornis is a species of beetle in the family Cerambycidae, and the only species in the genus Bulborhodopis. It was described by Breuning in 1948.

References

Desmiphorini
Beetles described in 1948
Monotypic Cerambycidae genera